Báo Mới ("new newspaper") is a Vietnamese news website. The site is not government owned and just copies news from other site (aggregation). The news site competes with other news websites such as Dân trí.

References

External links
 
 Blog.baomoi.com – Official blog

Vietnamese news websites
Vietnamese-language newspapers